Lysine-specific demethylase 4A is an enzyme that in humans is encoded by the KDM4A gene.

Function 

This gene is a member of the Jumonji domain 2 (JMJD2) family and encodes a protein with a JmjN domain, a JmjC domain, a JD2H domain, two TUDOR domains, and two PHD-type zinc fingers. This nuclear protein belongs to the alpha-ketoglutarate-dependent hydroxylase superfamily. It functions as a trimethylation-specific demethylase, converting specific trimethylated histone on histone H3 lysine 9 and 36 residues to the dimethylated form and lysine 9 dimethylated residues to monomethyl, and as a transcriptional repressor.

Alterations in this gene have been found associated with chromosomal instability that leads to cancer.

In humans, the role of Kdm4a as an oncogene, or cancer associated gene, is well established. It is implicated in prostate tumors, where it is overexpressed, and stimulates cell proliferation in colon cancer cells, where it promotes formation of the tumor itself. In lung cancer cell lines, where Kdm4a is also overexpressed, it coordinates with other oncogenes (like Ras) to transform normal cells into cancerous cells by inhibiting tumor suppressor pathways such as p53. Suppression of Kdm4a in breast cancer cell lines has shown to reduce cancer cell proliferation through cell cycle arrest, and decrease tumor migration and invasion.

In mice models, Kdm4a influences various processes leading up to implantation of the embryo. The expression of this gene is observed in all tissues critical to the female reproductive system, including the hypothalamus, pituitary, ovary, oviducts, and uterus, as well as embryonic development. A knockout of this gene in female mice has shown to negatively interfere with maintaining a maternal uterine environment suitable to receive and implant the blastocyst. It also interferes in the early embryonic development of the female mice's pups prior to implantation, leading to infertility. While mechanisms of normal ovulation and fertilization remain unaffected, infertility may also be partly due to decreased levels of Prolactin, a hormone crucial during the process of pregnancy. A knockout of Kdm4a has no effect on the fertility or viability of male pups.

References

Further reading 

 
 
 
 
 
 
 
 
 
 
 
 
 
 
 
 

Human 2OG oxygenases
EC 1.14.11